Giacomo Serra may refer to:

 Jaume Serra i Cau (died 1517), Spanish Valencian cardinal
 Giacomo Serra (cardinal) (1570-1623), Roman Catholic cardinal
 Giacomo Serra (sport shooter) (1893–?), Italian sports shooter at the 1924 Olympics